Piet van Nek (18 August 1916 – 14 March 1961) was a Dutch racing cyclist. He rode in the 1937 Tour de France.

References

1916 births
1961 deaths
Dutch male cyclists